The Cloud Mystery is a documentary by Danish director Lars Oxfeldt Mortensen. It explores the theory by Danish scientist Henrik Svensmark on how galactic cosmic rays and solar activity affects cloud cover, and how this influences the earth's climate. Also known as Klimamysteriet in Danish.

This documentary presents the work done to develop the theory that cloud cover change is caused by variations in cosmic rays as the major originator of global climate variation.  It also mentions that these scientists do not subscribe to the scientific consensus on climate change, which says that human influence and the effect of greenhouse gases are significant drivers of climate. However, the focus is on the work they have done and not on the consensus on anthropogenic global warming.

Release

The Cloud Mystery aired on TV2 (Denmark) in early 2008. It was also shown on Norway's NRK and on TV4 Fakta, (which can be viewed in Sweden and Finland.) and on Arte (April 2. 2010, "Das Geheimnis der Wolken") in Germany.

Opinions
Danish engineering trade weekly Ingenøren found that the documentary gave a sober overview of Henrik Svensmarks theory, though it lacked scientific criticism.

The documentary sparked a debate between supporters of the scientific consensus that carbon dioxide is the prime cause of global warming, and opponents. However, the scientific results of Svensmark and Nir Shaviv, two of the protagonists, forming the basis of the documentary, have been criticized by Mike Lockwood and Claus Froehlich (see Galactic Cosmic Rays vs Global Temperature).

See also
 Cosmic rays – Postulated role in climate change
 Milky Way
 Barred spiral galaxy
 Cloud condensation nuclei
 The Chilling Stars
 The Great Global Warming Swindle

References

External links
 

 The Cloud Mystery
 Another Inconvenient Truth? - The Copenhagen Posts overview of The Cloud Mystery and how it was received in the Danish press.
 Anmeldelse: Svensmarks klimamysterie på TV2 - review of The Cloud Mystery in the Danish engineering trade weekly Ingenøren.
 Official Website for The Cloud Mystery
 Website for director Lars Oxfeldt Mortensen
 Other documentary movies of Lars Oxfeldt Mortensen disputing the anthropic Global Warming (AGW): 
Doomsday called off
The climate conflict
 Epic Sound - official website for Simon Ravn, who composed the music for The Cloud Mystery
 Plot outline from TV2 World
 Nielsostenfeld.dk – official website for Niels Ostenfeld, film editor, The Cloud Mystery

Categoría:Películas escépticas del cambio climático

2008 documentary films
2008 films
Climate change denial
Danish documentary films
Documentary films about global warming
Environmentally skeptical films
2008 television films
2000s English-language films
English-language Danish films